Hymecromone (4-methylumbelliferone) is a drug used in bile therapy. It is used as choleretic and antispasmodic drugs and as a standard for the fluorometric determination of enzyme activity.

Hymecromone is a crystalline solid with a melting point of 194–195 °C.  It is soluble in methanol and glacial acetic acid.

See also
Umbelliferone
Coumarin

References

Coumarin drugs
Phenols